The Ivory Coast women's national football team has represented Ivory Coast at the FIFA Women's World Cup on one occasion, in 2015.

FIFA Women's World Cup results

Record by opponent

2015 FIFA Women's World Cup

Group B

Goalscorers

References

 
Countries at the FIFA Women's World Cup